George Leo Thomas (born May 19, 1950) is an American prelate of the Catholic Church who has served as Bishop of Las Vegas in Nevada since 2018.  He previously served as Bishop of Helena in Montana from 2004 to 2018 and as an auxiliary bishop of the Archdiocese of Seattle in Washington State from 1999 to 2004.

Biography

Early life 
George Thomas was born on May 19, 1950, in Anaconda, Montana, as the second of the five children of George and Mary (née Cronin) Thomas. Raised in Butte. Montana, he graduated from Butte Central Catholic High School in 1968, also when his family moved to Bellevue, Washington. Thomas studied at Carroll College in Helena, Montana, obtaining his bachelor degree in literature in 1972. He then went studied at St. Thomas Seminary in Bothell, Washington, earning his Master of Divinity degree there in 1976.

Priesthood 
Thomas was ordained to the priesthood for the Archdiocese of Seattle by Archbishop Raymond Hunthausen on May 22, 1976.  After his ordination, Thomas served in several parish assignments in Washington:

 Associate pastor at a Kirkland parish and at St. James Cathedral Parish 
 Parish administrator at Sacred Heart in Bellevue and Duvall 

Thomas also performed chaplain work for the King County Correctional Facility, the Seattle City Jail, and the Missionary Sisters of the Sacred Heart center, all in Seattle. For 10 years, he served as chair of the board of directors for Catholic Community Services in the archdiocese

Thomas entered graduate school at the University of Washington in 1981 and received a master's degree in counseling and community mental health in 1983. In 1986, he earned a Doctor of History degree, specializing in Pacific Northwest mission history.  Thomas became chancellor and vicar general the archdiocese in 1987.  He was named as apostolic administrator for the archdiocese following the death of Archbishop Thomas Murphy in 1997. He held the positions of chancellor and vicar general until 2004.

Auxiliary Bishop of Seattle 
On November 19, 1999, Thomas was named as an auxiliary bishop of the Archdiocese of Seattle and the titular bishop of Vagrauta by Pope John Paul II. He received his episcopal consecration on January 28, 2000, from Archbishop Alexander Brunett, with Bishops William S. Skylstad and Carlos Sevilla serving as co-consecrators.

Bishop of Helena

John Paul II named Thomas as the tenth bishop of the Diocese of Helena on March 23, 2004; he was installed on June 4, 2004.

Bishop of Las Vegas
On February 28, 2018, Thomas was appointed as bishop of the Diocese of Las Vegas by Pope Francis. He succeeded the retiring Bishop Joseph A. Pepe. In January 2022, Thomas wrote a column asking Catholic politicians who support abortion rights for women to not present themselves at mass for communion.

See also

 Catholic Church hierarchy
 Catholic Church in the United States
 Historical list of the Catholic bishops of the United States
 List of Catholic bishops of the United States
 Lists of patriarchs, archbishops, and bishops

References

External links
 Roman Catholic Diocese of Las Vegas Official Site

Roman Catholic bishops of Helena
Roman Catholic Archdiocese of Seattle
20th-century Roman Catholic bishops in the United States
21st-century Roman Catholic bishops in the United States
Carroll College (Montana) alumni
1950 births
Living people
People from Anaconda, Montana